The Aero-Kros MP-02 Czajka (English: Lapwing) is a Polish ultralight aircraft designed and developed by Aero-Kros of Krosno, introduced at the Aero show held in Friedrichshafen in 2009. The aircraft is supplied ready-to-fly.

Since March 2017 the design has been built by HMS Aviation, which is also located in Krosno, Poland.

Design and development
The Czajka was designed to comply with the Fédération Aéronautique Internationale microlight rules and US light-sport aircraft rules. It features a cantilever high-wing, a two seats in side-by-side configuration enclosed cockpit, tricycle landing gear and a single engine in tractor configuration.

The aircraft is made from carbon-fiber-reinforced polymer. Its  span wing employs Fowler flaps to keep the stall speed low enough for the FAI microlight category.

Specifications (MP-02)

References

External links 

2000s Polish ultralight aircraft